Senator Boylan may refer to:

John H. Boylan (1907–1981), Vermont State Senate
John J. Boylan (1878–1938), New York State Senate